Jason Meredith Reese  (24 June 1967 – 8 March 2019 was a British engineering scientist, and Regius Professor of Engineering at the University of Edinburgh.

His research was in multiscale flow systems in which the molecular or discrete nature of the fluid determines the overall fluid dynamics. A winner of the Philip Leverhulme Prize for Engineering (Leverhulme Trust), the Lord Kelvin Medal (Royal Society of Edinburgh), and a MacRobert Award (Royal Academy of Engineering) finalist, he was previously Weir Professor of Thermodynamics & Fluid Mechanics, and Head of the Mechanical & Aerospace Engineering Department, at the University of Strathclyde, Glasgow.

Education
Jason Reese studied at Imperial College London, graduating in Physics in 1988. He completed his Masters and Doctoral research in Applied Mathematics at the University of Oxford in 1993, where he was one of the last research students of Leslie Colin Woods.

Career and research
After his PhD, Reese moved into engineering and was a postdoctoral researcher at the Technical University of Berlin, and the University of Cambridge. In 1996 he became a lecturer in Engineering in the University of Aberdeen, and then joined King's College London in 2001 as Lecturer and ExxonMobil Engineering Fellow. He moved to the University of Strathclyde in 2003 as the Weir Professor of Thermodynamics & Fluid Mechanics, and was latterly Head of the Department of Mechanical & Aerospace Engineering. In 2013 he was appointed to the Regius Professorship at the University of Edinburgh, the ninth incumbent of this position since it was established by Queen Victoria in 1868.

Reese was an engineering scientist who conducted and published theoretical and computational research into multiscale fluid dynamics, in particular, micro and nano flows, as well as rarefied gas dynamics. He was also involved in the industrial application of fluid mechanics: he was part of the team that founded Brinker Technology Ltd in 2002 to commercialise a novel leak detection and sealing system for oil/gas pipelines and wellheads, and water mains pipes.

From 2012 to 2016, Reese was a member of the Scottish Science Advisory Council, Scotland's highest level science advisory body, providing independent advice and recommendations on science strategy, policy and priorities to the Scottish Government.

In 2018, he was awarded a 10-year Chair in Emerging Technologies by the Royal Academy of Engineering, to research and develop multiscale engineering design, "from molecules to machines".

Reese was an independent member of the Defence Science Expert Committee, DSEC, providing independent scientific and technological advice to the UK's Ministry of Defence. He was also an independent member of the Science & Technology Honours Committee, reviewing and advising on recommendations for UK national honours.

He died suddenly at the age of 51 on 8 March 2019; his full obituary was published in The Herald (Glasgow) on 24 March 2019.

Awards and honours
Recognition of his engineering achievements includes:

2000 ExxonMobil Engineering Fellowship, Royal Academy of Engineering
2003 Philip Leverhulme Prize for Engineering, Leverhulme Trust
2004 36th Bruce-Preller Prize Lectureship, Royal Society of Edinburgh
2005 Fellow of the Institute of Physics (FInstP)
2006 Fellow of the Institution of Mechanical Engineers (FIMechE)
2006 Fellow of the Royal Society of Edinburgh (FRSE)
2006 Finalist, MacRobert Award for Innovation in Engineering, Royal Academy of Engineering
2011 Fellow of the Royal Academy of Engineering (FREng)
2015 Lord Kelvin Medal (Senior Prize in Physical Sciences), Royal Society of Edinburgh
2016 Fellow of the American Physical Society (APS Fellow)
2018 Chair in Emerging Technologies, Royal Academy of Engineering

References

External links

1967 births
2019 deaths
British mechanical engineers
Alumni of Imperial College London
Alumni of the University of Oxford
Academics of King's College London
Academics of the University of Edinburgh
People associated with the University of Strathclyde
Academic staff of the Technical University of Berlin
20th-century British engineers
21st-century British engineers
Regius Professors of Engineering in Edinburgh University
Fellows of the Institute of Physics
Fellows of the Royal Society of Edinburgh
Fellows of the Royal Academy of Engineering
Fellows of the American Physical Society